This article lists the 12 different combat sports and their results for 2018.

Boxing

Amateur boxing
 March 24 – April 2: 2018 EUBC Under 22 European Boxing Championships in  Târgu Jiu
Italy won the overall medal tally.
 April 17 – 26: 2018 European Youth Boxing Championships in  Roseto degli Abruzzi
  won both the gold and overall medal tallies.
 April 19 – 28: 2018 Asian Youth Boxing Championships in  Bangkok
  won both the gold and overall medal tallies.
 May 5 – 13: 2018 African Youth Boxing Championships in  Casablanca
  won the gold medal tally. Morocco, &  won 11 overall medals each.
 May 19 – 27: 2018 Pan American Youth Boxing Championships in  Colorado Springs, Colorado
  won both the gold and overall medal tallies.
 May 29 – June 2: 2018 Oceania Youth Boxing Championships in  Apia
  won both the gold and overall medal tallies.
 August 20 – 31: 2018 AIBA Youth World Boxing Championships in  Budapest
 For results, click here.
 September 2 – 7: 2018 FISU World University Boxing Championships in  Elista
 November 15 – 24: 2018 AIBA Women's World Boxing Championships in  New Delhi
  won both the gold and overall medal tallies.

Professional boxing

Fencing

World fencing events
 April 1 – 10: 2018 World Junior and Cadet Fencing Championships in  Verona
  won the gold medal tally.  won the overall medal tally.
 July 19 – 27: 2018 World Fencing Championships in  Wuxi
  won the gold medal tally. Italy, and  won 7 overall medals each.

Continental fencing events
 February 24 – March 4: 2018 Asian Junior Fencing Championships in  Dubai
 Junior Épée winners:  KIM Myeong-ki (m) /  YU Sihan (f)
 Junior Foil winners:  Yudai Nagano (m) /  Yuka Ueno (f)
 Junior Sabre winners:  SONG Eun-gyun (m) /  JO Ye-won (f)
 Junior Team Épée winners:  (m) /  (f)
 Junior Team Foil winners:  (m) /  (f)
 Junior Team Sabre winners:  (m) /  (f)
 February 27 – March 11: 2018 Pan American Junior Fencing Championships in  San José
 Junior Épée winners:  Alexandre Camargo /  GUO Zishan (f)
 Junior Foil winners:  Kenji Bravo /  Delphine Devore (f)
 Junior Sabre winners:  Andrew Doddo /  Natalia Botello (f)
 Junior Team Épée winners:  (m) /  (f)
 Junior Team Foil winners:  (m) /  (f)
 Junior Team Sabre winners:  (m) /  (f)
 March 1 – 5: 2018 African Junior Fencing Championships in  Lagos
 Junior Épée winners:  Ahmed Elsayed (m) /  Lma Huzayen (f)
 Junior Foil winners:  Mohamed Hamza (m) /  Yara Elsharkawy (f)
 Junior Sabre winners:  Ahmed Ferjani (m) /  Chaima Benadouda (f)
 Junior Team Épée winners:  (m) /  (f)
 Junior Team Foil winners:  (m) /  (f)
 Junior Team Sabre winners:  (m) /  (f)
 March 2 – 11: 2018 European Junior Fencing Championships in  Sochi
 Junior Épée winners:  Davide di Veroli (m) /  Federica Isola (f)
 Junior Foil winners:  Kirill Borodachev (m) /  Martina Favaretto (f)
 Junior Sabre winners:  Maxime Pianfetti (m) /  Alina Mikhailova (f)
 Junior Team Épée winners:  (m) /  (f)
 Junior Team Foil winners:  (m) /  (f)
 Junior Team Sabre winners:  (m) /  (f)
 June 5 – 9: 2018 African Fencing Championships in  Tunis
 Épée winners:  Houssam Elkord (m) /  Aya Medany (f)
 Foil winners:  Alaaeldin Abouelkassem (m) /  Inès Boubakri (f)
 Sabre winners:  Farès Ferjani (m) /  Azza Besbes (f)
 Team Épée winners:  (m) /  (f)
 Team Foil winners:  (m) /  (f)
 Team Sabre winners:  (m) /  (f)
 June 15 – 20: 2018 Pan American Fencing Championships in  Havana
 Épée winners:  Jesús Andrés Lugones Ruggeri (m) /  Kelley Hurley (f)
 Foil winners:  Race Imboden (m) /  Lee Kiefer (f)
 Sabre winners:  Eli Dershwitz (m) /  Dagmara Wozniak (f)
 Team Épée winners:  (m) /  (f)
 Team Foil winners:  (m) /  (f)
 Team Sabre winners:  (m) /  (f)
 June 16 – 21: 2018 European Fencing Championships in  Novi Sad
 Épée winners:  Yannick Borel (m) /  Katrina Lehis (f)
 Foil winners:  Aleksey Cheremisinov (m) /  Inna Deriglazova (f)
 Sabre winners:  Max Hartung (m) /  Sofya Velikaya (f)
 Team Épée winners:  (m) /  (f)
 Team Foil winners:  (m) /  (f)
 Team Sabre winners:  (m) /  (f)
 June 17 – 22: 2018 Asian Fencing Championships in  Bangkok
 Épée winners:  Jung Jin-sun (m) /  Vivian Kong (f)
 Foil winners:  CHEUNG Siu Lun (m) /  Komaki Kikuchi (f)
 Sabre winners:  Gu Bon-gil (m) /  Kim Ji-yeon (f)
 Team Épée winners:  (m) /  (f)
 Team Foil winners:  (m) /  (f)
 Team Sabre winners:  (m) /  (f)

2017–18 Fencing Grand Prix
 Épée Grand Prix
 December 8 – 10, 2017: Qatari Grand Prix in  Doha
 Winners:  Park Sang-young (m) /  Ana Maria Popescu (f)
 March 23 – 25: Hungarian Grand Prix in  Budapest
 Winners:  Max Heinzer (m) /  Mara Navarria (f)
 May 25 – 27: Colombian Grand Prix in  Cali
 Winners:  Yannick Borel (m) /  Emese Szász-Kovács (f)
 Foil Grand Prix
 December 1 – 3, 2017: Italian Grand Prix in  Turin
 Winners:  Alexander Massialas (m) /  Inna Deriglazova (f)
 March 16 – 18: United States Grand Prix in  Long Beach, California
 Winners:  Race Imboden (m) /  Inna Deriglazova (f)
 May 18 – 20: Chinese Grand Prix in  Shanghai
 Winners:  Richard Kruse (m) /  Inna Deriglazova (f)
 Sabre Grand Prix
 December 15 – 17, 2017: Mexican Grand Prix in  Cancún
 Winners:  Oh Sang-uk (m) /  Olha Kharlan (f)
 March 30 – April 1: Korean Grand Prix in  Seoul
 Winners:  Áron Szilágyi (m) /  Olha Kharlan (f)
 May 11 – 13: Russian Grand Prix (final) in  Moscow
 Winners:  Oh Sang-uk (m) /  Sofya Velikaya (f)

2017–18 Fencing World Cup
 Men's Épée World Cup
 October 27 – 29, 2017: Swiss World Cup in  Bern
 Individual:  Park Sang-young
 Team: 
 November 17 – 19, 2017: Italian Men's Épée World Cup in  Legnano
 Individual:  András Rédli
 Team: 
 January 25 – 27: German Men's Épée World Cup in  Heidenheim an der Brenz
 Individual:  Kazuyasu Minobe
 Team: 
 February 16 – 18: Canadian World Cup in  Vancouver
 Individual:  Bohdan Nikishyn
 Team: 
 May 11 – 13: French Men's Épée World Cup in  Paris
 Individual:  Nikolai Novosjolov
 Team: 
 Women's Épée World Cup
 October 20 – 22, 2017: Estonian World Cup in  Tallinn
 Individual:  Mara Navarria
 Team: 
 November 10 – 12, 2017: Chinese World Cup in  Suzhou
 Individual:  Sun Yiwen
 Team: 
 January 19 – 21: Cuban World Cup in  Havana
 Individual:  Coraline Vitalis
 Team: 
 February 9 – 11: Spanish Women's Épée World Cup in  Barcelona
 Individual:  ZHU Mingye
 Team: 
 May 4 – 6: Emirati World Cup in  Dubai
 Individual:  Sun Yiwen
 Team: 
 Men's Foil World Cup
 October 20 – 22, 2017: Egyptian World Cup in  Cairo
 Individual:  Richard Kruse
 Team: 
 November 10 – 12, 2017: Japanese World Cup in  Tokyo
 Individual:  Erwann Le Péchoux
 Team: 
 January 19 – 21: French Men's Foil World Cup in  Paris
 Individual:  Alessio Foconi
 Team: 
 February 9 – 11: German Men's Foil World Cup in  Bonn
 Individual:  Aleksey Cheremisinov
 Team: 
 May 4 – 6: Russian World Cup in  Saint Petersburg
 Individual:  Maxime Pauty
 Team: 
 Women's Foil World Cup
 October 13 – 15, 2017: Mexican World Cup in  Cancún
 Individual:  Lee Kiefer
 Team: 
 November 3 – 5, 2017: French Women's Foil World Cup in  Saint-Maur-des-Fossés
 Individual:  Hong Hyo-jin
 Team: 
 January 12 – 14: Polish Women's Foil World Cup in  Gdańsk
 Individual:  Inna Deriglazova
 Team: 
 February 2 – 4: Algerian Women's Foil World Cup in  Algiers
 Individual:  Alice Volpi
 Team: 
 April 27 – 29: German Women's Foil World Cup in  Tauberbischofsheim
 Individual:  Inna Deriglazova
 Team: 
 Men's Sabre World Cup
 November 3 – 5, 2017: Algerian Men's Sabre World Cup in  Algiers
 Individual:  Eli Dershwitz
 Team: 
 December 1 – 3, 2017: Hungarian World Cup in  Győr
 Individual:  OH San-guk
 Team: 
 February 2 – 4: Italian Men's Sabre World Cup in  Padua
 Individual:  Eli Dershwitz
 Team: 
 February 23 – 25: Polish Men's Sabre World Cup in  Warsaw
 Individual:  Gu Bon-gil
 Team: 
 May 18 – 20: Spanish Men's Sabre World Cup in  Madrid
 Individual:  Enrico Berrè
 Team: 
 Women's Sabre World Cup
 October 27 – 29, 2017: French Women's Sabre World Cup in  Orléans
 Individual:  Rossella Gregorio
 Team: 
 November 17 – 19, 2017: Belgian World Cup in  Sint-Niklaas
 Individual:  Olha Kharlan
 Team: 
 January 26 – 28: American World Cup in  Baltimore
 Individual:  Martina Criscio
 Team: 
 March 16 – 18: Greek World Cup in  Athens
 Individual:  Bianca Pascu
 Team: 
 June 1 – 3: Tunisian World Cup in  Tunis
 Individual:  Manon Brunet
 Team:

Judo

World and continental judo events
 April 6 & 7: 2018 Oceania Judo Championships in / Nouméa
  won both the gold and overall medal tallies.
 April 12 – 15: 2018 African Judo Championships in  Tunis
  and  won 4 gold medals each.  won the overall medal tally.
 April 21 & 22: 2018 Pan American Judo Championships in  San José
  won both the gold and overall medal tallies.
 April 26 – 28: 2018 European Judo Championships in  Tel Aviv
  won both the gold and overall medal tallies.
 May 19 & 20: 2018 Kata European Judo Championships in  Koper
  won the gold medal tally.  won the overall medal tally.
 July 18: 2018 European Judo Mixed Teams Championships in  Yekaterinburg
  won both the gold and overall medal tallies.
 September 20 – 27: 2018 World Judo Championships in  Baku
  won both the gold and overall medal tallies.

2018 Grand Slam
 February 10 & 11: Grand Slam #1 in  Paris
  won both the gold and overall medal tallies.
 February 23 – 25: Grand Slam #2 in  Düsseldorf
  won both the gold and overall medal tallies.
 March 17 & 18: Grand Slam #3 in  Yekaterinburg
  won both the gold and overall medal tallies.
 October 27 – 29: Grand Slam #4 in  Abu Dhabi
  won the gold medal tally.  won the overall medal tally.
 November 23 – 25: Grand Slam #5 (final) in  Osaka
  won both the gold and overall medal tallies.

2018 Grand Prix
 January 19 – 21: GP #1 in  Tunis
  and  won 2 gold medals each.  won the overall medal tally.
 March 9 – 11: GP #2 in  Agadir
  won both the gold and overall medal tallies.
 March 30 – April 1: GP #3 in  Tbilisi
  and  won 5 gold medals each. Georgia won the overall medal tally.
 April 6 – 8: GP #4 in  Antalya
  won the gold medal tally.  won the overall medal tally.
 May 25 – 27: GP #5 in  Hohhot
  won both the gold and overall medal tallies.
 July 27 – 29: GP #6 in  Zagreb
  won both the gold and overall medal tallies.
 August 10 – 12: GP #7 in  Budapest
  won both the gold and overall medal tallies.
 October 12 – 14: GP #8 in  Cancún
 November 9 – 11: GP #9 in  Tashkent
  and  won 3 gold medals each.  won the overall medal tally.
 November 16 – 18: GP #10 (final) in  The Hague
  and  won 2 gold medals each. The  won the overall medal tally.

2018 European Open
 February 3 & 4: European Open #1 in  Odivelas (W) &  Sofia (M)
 Men:  won both the gold and overall medal tallies.
 Women:  and  won 2 gold medals each.  won the overall medal tally.
 February 17 & 18: European Open #2 in  Rome (W) &  Oberwart (M)
 Men:  and  won 2 gold medals each. Azerbaijan won the overall medal tally.
 Women:  won the gold medal tally.  won the overall medal tally.
 March 3 & 4: European Open #3 in  Warsaw (W) &  Prague (M)
 Men:  won both the gold and overall medal tallies.
 Women:  won both the gold and overall medal tallies.
 June 2 & 3: European Open #4 in  Madrid (M & W)
  and  won 3 gold medals each.  won the overall medal tally.
 August 18 & 19: European Open #5 in  Minsk (M & W)
  won the gold medal tally.  won the overall medal tally.
 October 6 & 7: European Open #6 (final) in  Glasgow (M & W)
  won both the gold and overall medal tallies.

2018 European Cup
 March 10 & 11: European Cup #1 in  Uster-Zürich
  won both the gold and overall medal tallies.
 April 7 & 8: European Cup #2 in  Dubrovnik
  won both the gold and overall medal tallies.
 May 5 & 6: European Cup #3 in  Sarajevo
  won both the gold and overall medal tallies.
 May 12 & 13: European Cup #4 in  Orenburg
  won both the gold and overall medal tallies.
 June 9 & 10: European Cup #5 in  Belgrade
  won both the gold and overall medal tallies.
 June 23 & 24: European Cup #6 in  Celje-Podčetrtek
  and  won 4 gold medals each.  won the overall medal tally.
 July 14 & 15: European Cup #7 in  Saarbrücken
  won the gold medal tally.  won the overall medal tally.
 September 1 & 2: European Cup #8 in  Bratislava
  won both the gold and overall medal tallies.
 October 27 & 28: European Cup #9 (final) in  Málaga
  won both the gold and overall medal tallies.

2018 EJU Kata Tournaments
 February 25: 2018 EJU Kata Tournament #1 in  Brussels
 Nage No Kata winners:  (Erik Faes & Niels Neumann)
 Ju No Kata winners:  (Giovanni Tarabelli & Angelica Tarabelli)
 Katame No Kata winners:  (Nicolas Gilon & Jean-Philippe Gilon)
 Kime No Kata winners:  (Michel Jeuffroy & Laurent Jeuffroy)
 Goshin Jutsu winners:  (Ubaldo Volpi & Maurizio Calderini)
 March 24: 2018 EJU Kata Tournament #2 in  Pordenone
 Nage No Kata winners:  (Mauro Collini & Tommaso Rondini)
 Katame No Kata winners:  (Nicolas Fourmaux & Jean-Daniel Nguyen)
 Ju No Kata winners:  (Wolfgang Daxromswinkel & Ulla Loosen)
 Kime No Kata winners:  (Michel Jeuffroy & Laurent Jeuffroy)
 Goshin Jutsu winners:  (Ubaldo Volpi & Maurizio Calderini)
 April 29: 2018 EJU Kata Tournament #3 (final) in  Tours
 Nage No Kata winners:  (Nicolas Gilon & Jean-Philippe Gilon)
 Katame No Kata winners:  (Nicolas Gilon & Jean-Philippe Gilon)
 Ju No Kata winners:  (Emmanuel Wirtz & Armelle Voindrot)
 Kime No Kata winners:  (Michel Jeuffroy & Laurent Jeuffroy)
 Goshin Jutsu winners:  (Kamel Ben Tekfa & Alexis Lacroix)

2018 Pan American Open
 March 10 & 11: Pan American Open #1 in  Santiago
  and  won 3 gold medals each.  won the overall medal tally.
 March 17 & 18: Pan American Open #2 in  Lima
  won both the gold and overall medal tallies.
 March 24 & 25: Pan American Open #3 in  Buenos Aires
  won the gold medal tally.  won the overall medal tally.
 September 1 & 2: Pan American Open #4 (final) in  Santo Domingo
  won both the gold and overall medal tallies.

2018 Asian Open
 July 7 & 8: Asian Open #1 in  Taipei
  and  won 5 gold medals each. South Korea won the overall medal tally.
 November 3 & 4: Asian Open #2 in  Aktau
  won both the gold and overall medal tallies.
 December 1 & 2: Asian Open #3 (final) in 
  won both the gold and overall medal tallies.

2018 African Open
 November 17 & 18: African Open #1 in  Dakar
  won both the gold and overall medal tallies.
 November 24 & 25: African Open #2 (final) in  Yaoundé
  won the gold medal tally.  won the overall medal tally.

2018 Oceania Open
 November 17 & 18: Oceania Open in  Perth
  won both the gold and overall medal tallies.

Karate

World & Continental Karate Events
 February 2 – 4: 45th EKF Junior, Cadet & U21 Championships in  Sochi
 May 10 – 13: 53rd EKF Senior Championships in  Novi Sad
  and  won 3 gold medals each.  won the overall medal tally.
 May 10 – 13: 17th AKF Cadet, Junior & U21 Championships in  Okinawa
  won both the gold and overall medal tallies.
 May 18 – 20: 18th OKF Cadet, Junior & U21 Championships in  Auckland
  won both the gold and overall medal tallies.
 June 15 – 17: 32nd PKF Senior Championships in  Santiago
  won both the gold and overall medal tallies.
 July 11 – 15: 15th AKF Senior Championships in  Amman
  won both the gold and overall medal tallies.
 July 19 – 22: 11th World University Karate Championship in  Kobe
  won both the gold and overall medal tallies.
 August 22 – 25: PKF Cadet, Junior & U21 Championships in  Rio de Janeiro
  won both the gold and overall medal tallies.
 August 31 – September 2: UFAK Senior Championships in  Kigali
  won both the gold and overall medal tallies.
 November 6 – 11: 24th WKF Senior Championships in  Madrid
  won both the gold and overall medal tallies.

WKF Premier League
 January 26 – 28: Karate 1-Premier League #1 in  Paris
  won the gold medal tally.  won the overall medal tally.
 February 16 – 18: Karate 1-Premier League #2 in  Dubai
  won the gold medal tally. Turkey and  won 6 overall medals each.
 March 16 – 18: Karate 1-Premier League #3 in  Rotterdam
  won the gold medal tally.  won the overall medal tally.
 April 6 – 8: Karate 1-Premier League #4 in  Rabat
Turkey won the overall medal tally.
 June 8 – 10: Karate 1-Premier League #5 in  Istanbul
  won both the gold and overall medal tallies.
 September 14 – 16: Karate 1-Premier League #6 in  Berlin
  won both the gold and overall medal tallies.
 October 12 – 14: Karate 1-Premier League #7 (final) in  Tokyo
  won both the gold and overall medal tallies.

WKF Series A
 February 9 – 11: Karate 1 - Series A #1 in  Guadalajara
  won both the gold and overall medal tallies.
 March 2 – 4: Karate 1 - Series A #2 in  Salzburg
  won both the gold and overall medal tallies.
 September 21 – 23: Karate 1 - Series A #3 in  Santiago
  won both the gold and overall medal tallies.
 December 7 – 9: Karate 1 - Series A #4 (final) in  Shanghai
  won the gold medal tally.  won the overall medal tally.

WKF Youth League
 May 25 – 27: Karate 1 - Youth League #1 in  Sofia
 Cadet:  and  won 2 gold medals each. Russia won the overall medal tally.
 Junior:  and  won 2 gold medals each. Japan won the overall medal tally.
 U14:  won both the gold and overall medal tallies.
 July 6 – 8: Karate 1 - Youth League #2 in  Umag
Russia won the overall medal tally.
 Junior:  won both the gold and overall medal tallies.
 U14:  won both the gold and overall medal tallies.
 October 26 – 28: Karate 1 - Youth League #3 in  Cancún
 Cadet:  won the gold medal tally.  won the overall medal tally.
 Junior:  won the gold medal tally.  won the overall medal tally.
 U14:  and  won 3 gold medals each. Mexico won the overall medal tally.
 December 14 – 16: Karate 1 - Youth League #4 (final) in  Caorle
Russia won the overall medal tally.
 Junior:  won the gold medal tally.  won the overall medal tally.
 U14:  won the gold medal tally.  won the overall medal tally.

Kickboxing

Kunlun Fight

Mixed martial arts

International mixed martial arts championships
 March 16 – 18: 2018 IMMAF Oceania Open Championships in  Melbourne
 Men's Lightweight winner:  Jordan Thomas
 Men's Welterweight winner:  Darian Weeks
 Men's Middleweight winner:  Joseph Luciano
 Men's Featherweight winner:  Kohei Maeda
 Men's Lightweight winner:  Teruhiko Kato
 Men's Welterweight winner:  Darian Weeks
 Men's Bantamweight winner:  Reo Yamaguchi
 Women's Bantamweight winner:  Amber Thompson
 Women's Flyweight winner:  Anne Wilson
 Women's Bantamweight winner:  Amber Thompson
 March 23 – 26: World Amateur Junior and Youth MMA Championships in  Saint Petersburg
 May 24 – 26: 2018 IMMAF Africa Open Championships in  Johannesburg
 June 17 – 23: 2018 IMMAF European Championships and European Youth Open in  Bucharest
 September 3 – 8: 2018 IMMAF Asian Open and Junior MMA World Championships in  Beijing

Muay Thai
 May 10 – 19: 2018 IFMA World Championships in  Cancún
 June 29 – July 8: 2018 European Championships in  Prague
 July 23 – 29: 1st World University Muaythai Championship in  Pattaya
 August 3 – 11: 2018 Youth World Championships in  Bangkok
 October 26 – 29: 2018 Pan American Championships in  Acapulco
 December 3 – 11: 2018 Asian Championships in

Sambo

World and Continental Championships
 April 11 & 12: Southeast Asian SAMBO Championships (M&W, Combat Sambo) in  Jakarta
  won both the gold and overall medal tallies.
 April 13 – 15: 2018 European Youth and Junior Championships in  Prague
  won both the gold and overall medal tallies.
 May 11 – 13: 2018 Asian Sambo Championships & Asian Youth and Junior Championships in  Ulaanbaatar
  won both the gold and overall medal tallies.
 May 18 – 20: European Sambo Championships in  Athens
  won both the gold and overall medal tallies.
 June 23 & 25: African Sambo Championships in  Tunis
 July 21 & 22: Pan American Sambo Championships in  Acapulco
 August 23 & 24: World Schools Sambo Championships in  Oryol
 September 28: European Union Sambo Cup in  Riga
 October 12 – 14: World Youth & Junior Sambo Championships in  Tbilisi
 October 20 & 21: World Masters Sambo Championships in 
 November 9 – 11: World Sambo Championships in  Bucharest
 December 6 & 7: World Cadets Sambo Championships in  Novi Sad
 December 7 – 9: 2nd World University Sambo Championships in  Novi Sad
 December 16: European Sambo Cup in  Madrid

World Cup
 March 23 & 24: WC (A. Kharlampiev Memorial) #1 in  Moscow
  won both the gold and overall medal tallies.

Sumo

Taekwondo

International Taekwondo championships
 February 6 – 9: 2018 European Clubs Taekwondo Championships in  Istanbul
  won both the gold and overall medal tallies.
 March 29 & 30: 2018 African Taekwondo Championships in  Agadir
  won both the gold and overall medal tallies.
 March 31: 2018 President's Cup - African Region in  Agadir
  won the gold medal tally.  won the overall medal tally.
 April 9 – 13: 2018 World Taekwondo Junior Championships in  Hammamet
  won both the gold and overall medal tallies.
 April 23 & 24: 2018 Asian Taekwondo Club Championships in  Karaj
  won all the gold medals and the overall medal tally.
 April 25 – 28: 2018 World Taekwondo Beach Championships in  Rhodes
 Recognized Poomsae
 Under 17 winners:  Michelangelo Sampognaro (m) /  Eva Sandersen (f)
 Under 30 (Age 18-30) winners:  Frans Salmi (m) /  Kubra Dagli (f)
 Under 30 (Age 31 and up) winners:  Othman Boularas (m) /  LI Wenqi (f)
 Pair Under 17 winners:  (Kanokchanok Jareonying & Pattarapong Sengmueang)
 Pair Under 30 (Age 18-30) winners:  (Annaline Soeberg & Benjamin Harder)
 Pair Over 30 (Age 31 and up) winners:  (Lisa Lents & Kim Nedergaard)
 Team Under 17 winners:  (m) /  (f)
 Team Over 17 winners:  (m) /  (f)
 Freestyle Poomsae
 Under 17 (Age 15-17) winners:  Thanaphat Bompenthomnumsuk (m) /  Anastasiia Sumenkova (f)
 Over 17 (Age 18 and up) winners:  Christian Kamphuis (m) /  Soraya Wahjudi (f)
 Pair Over 17 winners:  (Sandra Gardini Gallo & Adrian Alonso Simon)
 Team winners: 
 Technical Breaking
 Jumping Multiple Kick winner:  SEO Jae-won
 Spinning Kick winner:  JANG Jong-pil
 Free Style Breaking winner:  KIM Min-song
 High Kick Performance winners:  Kübra Dağlı (f) /  PARK Seung-jin (f)
 Free Style Dynamic Kicks & Breaking Challenge
 Winners:  LEE Chan-min (m) /  CHOE Han-na (f)
 April 25 – 29: 2018 President's Cup - European Region in  Athens
  won both the gold and overall medal tallies.
 May 10 – 13: 2018 European Taekwondo Championships in  Kazan
  won both the gold and overall medal tallies.
 May 26 – 28: 2018 Asian Taekwondo Championships in  Ho Chi Minh City
  won both the gold and overall medal tallies.
 May 31 – June 10: 2018 World Taekwondo Europe Open Multi European Games in  Plovdiv
 Senior:  and  won 3 gold medals each. Turkey won the overall medal tally.
 Junior:  and  won 5 gold medals each. Greece won the overall medal tally.
 Cadet:  won both the gold and overall medal tallies.
 June 1 – 3: 2018 Rome World Taekwondo Grand-Prix in 
  won the gold medal tally.  won the overall medal tally.
 July 5 – 8: 2018 El Hassan Cup International Open in  Amman
  won both the gold and overall medal tallies.
 July 13 – 15: 2018 Pan Am Taekwondo Championships in  Spokane, Washington
  won the gold medal tally.  won the overall medal tally. 
 July 27 – 29: 2018 World Taekwondo World Cup Team Championships in  Wuxi
 Men's winners: 
 Women's winners: 
 Mixed winners: 
 August 3: 2018 President's Cup - Oceania Region in  Mahina
  won both the gold and overall medal tallies.
 August 5: 2018 Oceania Taekwondo Championships in  Mahina
 Senior:  won all the gold medals and won the overall medal tally, too.
 Junior:  won both the gold and overall medal tallies.
 August 10 – 12: 2018 Moscow World Taekwondo Grand-Prix in 
  won both the gold and overall medal tallies.
 August 11 – 15: 2018 Kimunyong Cup International Open Taekwondo Championships in  Seoul
  won both the gold and overall medal tallies.
 September 7 – 9: 2018 Asian Taekwondo Open Championships in  Atyrau (debut event)
  won the gold medal tally.  won the overall medal tally.
 September 19 – 21: Taoyuan 2018 World Taekwondo Grand-Prix in 
  won both the gold and overall medal tallies.
 October 12 – 14: 2018 President's Cup - Pan American Region in  Las Vegas
  won the gold medal tally.  won the overall medal tally.
 October 19 – 21: 2018 Manchester World Taekwondo Grand-Prix in 
  won both the gold and overall medal tallies.
 November 11 – 13: 2018 President's Cup - Asian Region in  Taipei
 Senior:  won the gold medal tally.  won the overall medal tally.
 Junior:  won both the gold and overall medal tallies.
 Cadet:  won both the gold and overall medal tallies.
 November 22 & 23: 2018 World Taekwondo Grand-Prix Final in  Fujairah
  won both the gold and overall medal tallies.
 November 24 & 25: 2018 World Taekwondo Team Championships in  Fujairah
 Men -> Champions: ; Second: ; Third:  & 
 Women -> Champions: ; Second: ; Third:  & 
 Mixed -> Champions: ; Second: ; Third:  & 
 December 9 – 16: 2018 World Taekwondo Grand Slam Series in  Wuxi
  and  won 2 gold medals each.  won the overall medal tally.

2018 WTF Open
 February 10 – 14: Turkish Open in  Istanbul
  won both the gold and overall medal tallies.
 February 16 – 18: Fujairah Open in the 
  won the gold medal tally. The  won the overall medal tally.
 February 24 & 25: Slovenia Open in  Maribor
  and  won 4 gold medals each. Croatia won the overall medal tally.
 February 24 & 25: Egypt Open in  Alexandria
  won the gold medal tally.  won the overall medal tally.
 March 1 – 4: Malaysia Open in  Kuala Lumpur
  won both the gold and overall medal tallies.
 March 3 & 4: Sofia Open in 
  won the gold medal tally.  won the overall medal tally.
 March 8 – 11: Mexico Open in  Monterrey
  won both the gold and overall medal tallies.
 March 10 & 11: Dutch Open in  Eindhoven
  won the gold medal tally.  won the overall medal tally.
 March 16 – 18: Belgian Open in  Lommel
  and  won 3 gold medals each.  won the overall medal tally.
 March 16 – 18: Ukraine Open in  Kharkiv
  won both the gold and overall medal tallies.
 March 25: Spanish Open in  Alicante
  won both the gold and overall medal tallies.
 April 7 & 8: German Open in  Hamburg
  won both the gold and overall medal tallies.
 April 21 & 22: Fajr Open in  Karaj
  won all the gold medals and the overall medal tally.
 May 26 & 27: Austrian Open in  Innsbruck
  won both the gold and overall medal tallies.
 June 16 & 17: LuxOpen in  Luxembourg City
  won both the gold and overall medal tallies.
 July 18 – 24: Korea Open in  Jeju City
  won both the gold and overall medal tallies.
 August 3 – 5: Argentina Open in  Buenos Aires
  won both the gold and overall medal tallies.
 August 30 – September 2: Costa Rica Open in  San José
  won the gold medal tally.  won the overall medal tally.
 September 3 – 6: Russia Open in  Moscow
  won both the gold and overall medal tallies.
 September 6 – 8: Palestinian Open in  Ramallah
 Senior:  won the gold medal tally.  won the overall medal tally.
 Junior:  won both the gold and overall medal tallies.
 Cadet:  won both the gold and overall medal tallies.
 September 13 – 16: Canada Open in  Richmond
  won the gold medal tally.  won the overall medal tally. 
 September 14 – 16: Polish Open Cup in  Warsaw
  and  won 4 gold medals each. Croatia won the overall medal tally.
 September 21 – 23: Lebanon Open in  Beirut
  won the gold medal tally.  won the overall medal tally.
 October 6 & 7: Riga Open in 
 Senior:  won both the gold and overall medal tallies.
 Junior:  won both the gold and overall medal tallies.
 Cadet:  won both the gold and overall medal tallies.
 October 19 – 21: Greek Open in  Athens
  won both the gold and overall medal tallies.
 October 27 & 28: Serbian Open in  Belgrade
  won both the gold and overall medal tallies.
 November 10 & 11: Croatia Open in  Zagreb
  and  won 4 gold medals each. Croatia won the overall medal tally.
 November 24 & 25: Israel Open in  Ramla
 Senior:  and  won 4 gold medals each. France and  won 10 overall medals each.
Israel won the overall medal tally.
 Cadet:  won both the gold and overall medal tallies.

Wrestling

World wrestling championships
 May 14 – 20: 2018 World Military Wrestling Championships in  Moscow
 Men's Freestyle:  won both the gold and overall medal tallies.
 Women's Freestyle:  won both the gold and overall medal tallies.
 Greco-Roman:  won both the gold and overall medal tallies.
 July 2 – 8: 2018 World Cadet Wrestling Championships in  Zagreb
 Cadet Men's Freestyle:  won both the gold and overall medal tallies.
 Cadet Women's Freestyle:  won both the gold and overall medal tallies.
Iran won the overall medal tally.
 September 5 – 9: 2018 World University Wrestling Championships in  Goiana
Japan won the overall medal tally.
 Women's Freestyle:  won both the gold and overall medal tallies.
 Greco-Roman:  won both the gold and overall medal tallies.
 September 17 – 23: 2018 World Junior Wrestling Championships in  Trnava
 Junior Men's Freestyle:  won both the gold and overall medal tallies.
 Junior Women's Freestyle:  won both the gold and overall medal tallies.
 Junior Greco-Roman:  won the gold medal tally.  won the overall medal tally. 
 September 28 – 30: 2018 World Veterans Wrestling Championships (Men's Freestyle) in  Skopje
  won both the gold and overall medal tallies.
 October 5 – 7: 2018 World Veterans Wrestling Championships (Greco-Roman) in  Perm
  won both the gold and overall medal tallies.
 October 20 – 28: 2018 World Wrestling Championships in  Budapest
  won both the gold and overall medal tallies.
 November 12 – 18: 2018 U23 World Wrestling Championships in  Bucharest
 Men's U23 Freestyle:  won the gold medal tally.  won the overall medal tally.
 Women's U23 Freestyle:  won both the gold and overall medal tallies.
 U23 Greco-Roman:  won both the gold and overall medal tallies.

Wrestling World Cup
 March 17 & 18: 2018 Women's Freestyle World Cup in  Takasaki, Gunma
 Champions: ; Second: ; Third: 
 April 7 & 8: 2018 Men's Freestyle World Cup in  Iowa City, Iowa
 Champions: ; Second: ; Third: 
 December 13 & 14: 2018 World Men's Wrestling Clubs Cup (Freestyle) in  Babol
 Champions:  #1; Second: ; Third:  #2
 December 20 & 21: 2018 World Men's Wrestling Clubs Cup (Greco-Roman) in  Ardabil
 Champions:  Bimeh Razi Ardabil; Second: ; Third:  Sina Sanat Izeh

Wrestling Grand Prix
 February 3: 2018 Grand Prix of Croatia in  Zagreb
Hungary won the overall medal tally.
 June 23 & 24: 2018 Grand Prix of Hungary in  Győr
 Greco-Roman:  won the gold medal tally.  won the overall medal tally.
 July 14 & 15: 2018 Grand Prix of Spain in  Madrid
 Men's Freestyle:  and  won 2 gold medals each. Spain won the overall medal tally.
 Women's Freestyle:  won both the gold and overall medal tallies.
 Greco-Roman:  won both the gold and overall medal tallies.
 August 18 & 19: 2018 Grand Prix of Germany in  Dortmund
 Greco-Roman:  won both the gold and overall medal tallies.

Continental wrestling championships
 February 7 – 11: 2018 African Wrestling Championships (Senior, Junior, & Cadet) in  Port Harcourt
 Men's Freestyle:  won both the gold and overall medal tallies.
 Women's Freestyle:  won both the gold and overall medal tallies.
 Greco-Roman:  won the gold medal tally.  won the overall medal tally.
Nigeria won the overall medal tally.
 Junior Women's Freestyle:  won the gold medal tally. Tunisia and  won 8 overall medals each.
 Junior Greco-Roman:  won the gold medal tally. Egypt and  won 8 overall medals each.
 Cadet Men's Freestyle:  won the gold medal tally.  and  won 6 overall medals each.
 Cadet Women's Freestyle:  won both the gold and overall medal tallies.
 Cadet Greco-Roman:  and  won 3 gold medals each.  won the overall medal tally.
 February 27 – March 4: 2018 Asian Wrestling Championships in  Bishkek
 Men's Freestyle:  and  won 3 gold medals each. Uzbekistan won the overall medal tally.
 Women's Freestyle:  won the gold medal tally.  won the overall medal tally.
 Greco-Roman:  won the gold medal tally.  won the overall medal tally.
 March 20 – 25: 2018 Central American and Caribbean Wrestling Championship in  Havana
 Men's Freestyle:  won all the gold medals and the overall medal tally.
 Women's Freestyle:  won the gold medal tally.  won the overall medal tally.
 Greco-Roman:  won both the gold and overall medal tallies.
 March 29 – 31: 2018 Mediterranean Wrestling Championship in  Algiers
 Men's Freestyle:  won the gold medal tally.  won the overall medal tally.
 Women's Freestyle:  won the gold medal tally. Tunisia and  won 7 overall medals each.
 Greco-Roman:  won both the gold and overall medal tallies.
 Junior Men's Freestyle:  won both the gold and overall medal tallies.
 Junior Women's Freestyle:  won the gold medal tally.  won the overall medal tally.
 Junior Greco-Roman:  won both the gold and overall medal tallies.
 Cadet Men's Freestyle:  won both the gold and overall medal tallies.
 Cadet Women's Freestyle:  won both the gold and overall medal tallies.
 Cadet Greco-Roman:  and  won 3 gold medals each. Algeria won the overall medal tally.
 April 20 & 21: 2018 Arab Cadet Wrestling Championship in  Baghdad
 Cadet Men's Freestyle:  won both the gold and overall medal tallies.
 Cadet Greco-Roman:  won both the gold and overall medal tallies.
 April 30 – May 6: 2018 European Wrestling Championships in  Kaspiysk
 Men's Freestyle:  won the gold medal tally. Russia and  won 8 overall medals each.
Russia won the overall medal tally.
 Greco-Roman:  won both the gold and overall medal tallies.
 May 3 – 6: 2018 Pan American Wrestling Championships in  Lima
 Men's Freestyle:  won both the gold and overall medal tallies.
 Women's Freestyle:  won both the gold and overall medal tallies.
 Greco-Roman:  won the gold medal tally. Cuba and the  won 6 overall medals each.
 May 10 – 13: 2018 Asian Cadet Wrestling Championships in  Tashkent
 Cadet Men's Freestyle:  won the gold medal tally. Iran and  won 8 overall medals each.
 Cadet Women's Freestyle:  won both the gold and overall medal tallies.
 Cadet Greco-Roman:  won the gold medal tally. Iran and  won 7 overall medals each.
 May 14 – 20: 2018 European Cadet Wrestling Championships in  Skopje
 Cadet Men's Freestyle:  won both the gold and overall medal tallies.
 Cadet Women's Freestyle:  won both the gold and overall medal tallies.
 Cadet Greco-Roman:  won both the gold and overall medal tallies.
 May 18 – 20: 2018 Oceania Wrestling Championships (Senior, Junior, & Cadet) in  Yigo
 Men's Freestyle:  won the gold medal tally.  won the overall medal tally.
 Women's Freestyle: All events (except the 55 kg event) were won by default.
 Greco-Roman:  won the gold medal tally.  won the overall medal tally.
American Samoa won the overall medal tally.
 Junior Women's Freestyle: All events here were won by default.
American Samoa won the overall medal tally.
 Cadet Men's Freestyle:  won the gold medal tally. New Zealand and  won 4 overall medals each.
 Cadet Women's Freestyle: All individual women's wrestlers here won a gold medal by default.
 Cadet Greco-Roman:  won both the gold and overall medal tallies.
 May 19: 2018 Nordic Senior Wrestling Championships in  Västerås
 Men's Freestyle:  and  won 2 gold medals each.  won the overall medal tally.
 Women's Freestyle:  won both the gold and overall medal tallies.
 Greco-Roman:  won both the gold and overall medal tallies.
 May 25 – 27: 2018 Pan American Cadet Wrestling Championships in  Guatemala City
 Cadet Men's Freestyle:  won both the gold and overall medal tallies.
 Cadet Women's Freestyle:  won both the gold and overall medal tallies.
 Cadet Greco-Roman:  won both the gold and overall medal tallies.
 May 26 & 27: 2018 Nordic Junior and Cadet Wrestling Championships in  Kajaani
 Note: There were no junior freestyle events in this championship.
 Junior Greco-Roman:  won the gold medal tally. Estonia and  won 7 overall medals each.
 Cadet Men's Freestyle:  won both the gold and overall medal tallies.
 Cadet Women's Freestyle:  won the gold medal tally.  won the overall medal tally.
 Cadet Greco-Roman:  won the gold medal tally.  won the overall medal tally.
 June 4 – 10: 2018 European U23 Wrestling Championships in  Istanbul
 Men's Freestyle:  won both the gold and overall medal tallies.
 Women's Freestyle:  and  won 3 gold and 6 overall medals each.
 Greco-Roman:  and  won 3 gold medals each. Russia and  won 7 overall medals each.
 July 17 – 22: 2018 Asian Junior Wrestling Championships in  New Delhi
 Junior Men's Freestyle:  won both the gold and overall medal tallies.
 Junior Women's Freestyle:  won the gold medal tally.  won the overall medal tally.
 Junior Greco-Roman:  won both the gold and overall medal tallies.
 July 25 & 26: 2018 Arab Senior Wrestling Championships in  Sharm El Sheikh
 Men's Freestyle:  won both the gold and overall medal tallies.
 Greco-Roman:  won all the gold medals and won the overall medal tally, too.
 July 30 – August 5: 2018 European Junior Wrestling Championships in  Rome
 Junior Men's Freestyle:  won the gold medal tally.  won the overall medal tally.
 Junior Women's Freestyle:  won both the gold and overall medal tallies.
 Junior Greco-Roman:  won both the gold and overall medal tallies.
 August 17 – 19: 2018 Pan American Junior Wrestling Championships in  Fortaleza
 Junior Men's Freestyle:  won both the gold and overall medal tallies.
 Junior Women's Freestyle:  and  won 3 gold medals each. Mexico and  won 7 overall medals each.
 Junior Greco-Roman:  won the gold medal tally. The United States and  won 7 overall medals each.
 November 1 – 4: 2018 Balkan Junior Wrestling Championships in  Tirana
 Junior Men's Freestyle:  won both the gold and overall medal tallies.
 Junior Women's Freestyle:  won all the gold medals and the overall medal tally, too.
 Junior Greco-Roman:  won both the gold and overall medal tallies.

Wushu
  won the gold medal tally. China and  won 8 overall medals each.

References

External links
 International Boxing Association (Amateur)
 FIE - Fédération Internationale d'Escrime (International Fencing Federation)
 International Judo Federation
 World Karate Federation
 World Association of Kickboxing Organizations
 International Mixed Martial Arts Federation
 International Federation of Muaythai Amateur
 International Sambo Federation
 World Taekwondo Federation
 United World Wrestling
 International Wushu Federation

Combat sports
combat
2018 sport-related lists